Aloyseum is a museum on the St Aloysius College campus in Mangalore city of Karnataka in India. It was established in the year 1913.

History
This museum began in 1913 when an Italian Jesuit priest named Chiapi donated around 2000 different types of minerals, Herbarium and a collection of Roman coins. In 1906, the De Dion car was the first automobile that was used in Mangalore. It was imported to Mangalore by P F X Saldanha of the Highland Coffee Works. This car is one of the souvenirs present in this museum. The museum also has a collection of domestic and agricultural utensils used by the ancient generation.

Exhibition galleries
This museum contains artifacts such as stone age tools, postal stamps, Roman coins, pieces of the Berlin Wall, drawings of Antonio Moscheni, paintings of European artists, spears and arrows of Abyssinia, Neolithic stone axe, telegraphic equipment, Mangalore's first car and generator, whale skeleton, old musical instruments, etc.

References

1913 establishments in India
Museums established in 1913
Museums in Mangalore
Culture of Mangalore
Tourist attractions in Mangalore
Museums in Karnataka
History museums in India